Attica Springboks RFC is a Greek rugby club in Athens. Many of the founder members were from South Africa, whose national team is called the Springboks, hence the name. The club is one of three Greek clubs officially recognised as an amateur sports club under law Ν. 2725/1999.

Home Field
Attica Springboks is based at Glyka Nera municipal stadium north of Athens

Youth academy, Women's team and Veterans team
Attica Springboks fields a youth academy with children aged 5–17, a women's team and a veterans team.

History
The club was founded in October 2000. So far, it has won one championship in 2012.

Titles
Greek Championship Rugby Union (1): 2012

External links
Attica Springboks RFC
Hellenic Rugby Federation

Rugby clubs established in 2000
Greek rugby union teams
Sports clubs in Athens